Formosa agariphila is a Gram-negative, heterotrophic and aerobic bacterium from the genus Formosa which occur in marine environments.

References

Flavobacteria
Bacteria described in 2006